Hypnogyra is a genus of beetles belonging to the family Staphylinidae.

The species of this genus are found in Europe, Japan and Northern America.

Species:
 Hypnogyra angularis (Ganglbauer, 1895) 
 Hypnogyra formosae (Cameron, 1949)

References

Staphylinidae
Staphylinidae genera